This is a list of seasons played by Northampton Town Football Club in English football. It covers the period from the club's inaugural season in 1899, to the end of the last completed season. It details the club's achievements in all major competitions, together with the top scorers and the average attendances for each season. Details of the abandoned 1939–40 season and unofficial Second World War leagues are not included.

Northampton Town were founded in 1897, joining the Northamptonshire League and then the Midland League for two seasons before taking their place in the Southern League, and finally joined The Football League for the 1920–21 season.

Seasons

Key

Key to league record:
P = Played
W = Games won
D = Games drawn
L = Games lost
F = Goals for
A = Goals against
Pts = Points
Pos = Final position

Key to divisions:
Div 1 = Football League First Division
Div 2 = Football League Second Division
Div 3 = Football League Third Division
Div 4 = Football League Fourth Division
L1 = Football League One
L2 = Football League Two
SL = Southern League
ML = Midland League
NL = Northamptonshire League

Key to rounds:
DNE = Did not enter
PR = Preliminary round
1QR = First Qualifying Round
2QR = Second Qualifying Round
3QR = Third Qualifying Round
4QR = Fourth Qualifying Round
5QR = Fifth Qualifying Round
6QR = Sixth Qualifying Round
R1 = Round 1
R2 = Round 2
R3 = Round 3
R4 = Round 4

R5 = Round 5
Grp = Group stage
QF = Quarter-finals
AQF = Area Quarter-finals
SF = Semi-finals
ASF = Area Semi-finals
RU = Runners-up
W = Winners

Top scorers shown in bold are Northampton Town who were also top scorers in their division that season.

Footnotes and references

External links
Northampton Town Football Club History Database.

Northampton Town
Seasons